Finmark may refer to:

 Finmark, Ontario, a community in the Thunder Bay District of Ontario
 the Sápmi (area)
 a misspelling of Finnmark, a county in Norway.
 a misspelling of Finland, a Nordic country.